Philipp Marx and Igor Zelenay were the defending champions, but Zelenay did not participate.
Marx partnered with Michael Kohlmann, however they were eliminated by their compatriots Martin Emmrich and Andre Begemann in the quarterfinals.
Alexander Peya and Martin Slanar won in the final 7–6(1), 6–3, over Rameez Junaid and Frank Moser.

Seeds

Draw

Draw

External links
 Main Draw

ATP Salzburg Indoors - Doubles
ATP Salzburg Indoors